Hajjar is an Arabic word meaning stone. It may refer to:

Hajjar (surname), a list of people with this name 
Ḥajjar Lamīs, a region of Chad
Hajjar mountains in the Arabian peninsula

See also
Hajar (disambiguation)
Al Hajar (disambiguation)